Caenopedina cubensis is a species of sea urchins of the Family Pedinidae. Their armor is covered with spines. Caenopedina cubensis was first scientifically described in 1869 by Alexander Emanuel Agassiz.

References

Animals described in 1869
Pedinoida